Sikuru Yogaya is a 2019 Sri Lankan Sinhala comedy film directed by Bermin Laili Fernando and co-produced by director himself with Vasath Chandrasiri Gamlath, Mark Antony Fernando and Daminda Dias for Dave Films Productions. It stars late Vijaya Nandasiri with Anarkali Akarsha in lead roles along with Tennyson Cooray and Rodney Warnakula. Theme music composed by veteran musician Navaratne Gamage, and background musical score by Priyanath Rathnayake and Ravihans Watakepotha. It is the 1334th Sri Lankan film in the Sinhala cinema. The film has inspired by the comedy sitcom Bodima.

Plot

Cast
 Vijaya Nandasiri as Master
 Anarkali Akarsha as Hiruni
 Tennyson Cooray as Koha
 Rodney Warnakula as Piyadasa
 Anusha Damayanthi as Anusha
 Mahinda Pathirage as Tuition master
 Amila Karunanayake as Geeth
 Premadasa Vithanage
 Daya Alwis as Weda mahaththaya
 Bandula Wijeweera as Vijay
 Gamini Ambalangoda as Hettiarachchi 
 Menaka Maduwanthi as Tharuki
 Jeevan Handunetti
 Kumuduni Adikari as Kumuduni, Master's wife
 Nipuni Wilson
 Sanet Dikkumbura as Wilson

Soundtrack
The film consists with two original songs as well as many old time hits.

References

External links
 Official trailer

2019 films
2010s Sinhala-language films